Listing and approval use and compliance is the practice of installing and operating safety-related products and materials in accordance with to minimum performance conformance testing requirements. The conformance could be for a certification listing or for an approval that has been issued by an organization that is accredited both for testing and product certification. Such organizations include Underwriters Laboratories, FM Global, or the Deutsches Institut für Bautechnik (DIBt).

Required listings or tests is often cited by a regulation such as a building code or a fire code and is enforced through adopted codes or regulations. In the absence of a standard test method, local building officials can review and approve results from qualified testing agencies on an ad-hoc basis if the evidence shows compliance for a material, product or construction method that provides equivalent strength, quality, fire resistance, durability and safety as compared to the building code objectives.

Governmental accreditation of laboratories 
National, governmental accreditors, such as Germany's Deutsches Institut für Bautechnik or Canada's SCC (Standards Council of Canada) can "accredit" laboratories. Such laboratories must conform to national or engineering standards. Compliance is periodically tested by the accreditor through inspections in which random client files are audited to see that the laboratory followed all appropriate procedures. Accreditors can accredit laboratories for testing, as well as for product certification. For product certification, the laboratory or the accreditor (as in the case of Germany) witnesses the production of test materials and obtains copies of process standards. Test products are shipped to the laboratory for incorporation in the test. Certification listings or approvals that follow a successful test are subject to the maintenance of continuous factory auditing to verify the tested product is identical as is currently manufactured, or documented proof that the products made continue to meet quality control standards set out as a function of the approvals process.

Testing by laboratories without national accreditation 
Testing by organizations or laboratories who hold no national accreditation for testing purposes are not subject to mandatory governmental audits of compliance with applicable requirements. Even an organisation that is nationally accredited for testing purposes may not necessarily issue test reports that provide assurance that commercial products tested by it are the same as what is being sold or used by the public.

Testing for the purpose of achieving product certification 
Product certification involves testing a product to a test standard that is accepted in the region in which the product will be sold. For instance, in the case of a firestop, Underwriters' Laboratories of Canada ULC-S115 is the test method that must be used by a laboratory whose tests are to be accepted in Canada. ULC is nationally accredited in Canada to write standards, test products and to certify products.

Because Canada uses the accreditation model of a national accrediting authority, if an organisation tests a firestop in or for use in Canada, in accordance with the correct standard (ULC-S115), but is not accredited by the SCC, the test results cannot be used to in any approvals of field installations on Canadian construction sites.

Documentation
After testing, the testing laboratory issues a confidential test report to the manufacturer.

If the product passes the testing required for certification, the items in the test that passed are given a certification listing, which describes the product(s) that were tested, the application, and maximum and minimum tolerances for all components. Certification listings are short versions and interpretations of the test results. A certification listing indicates that the test has been properly conducted, the tested systems passed, and that a follow-up agreement is in effect between the manufacturer or submitter and the certifier. In the event that irregularities are discovered on the part of the manufacturer - substitutions of cheaper ingredients or components, deliberate or inadvertent irregularities, or an ingredient or component of a tested system which is no longer be available has been substituted - the listing can be de-activated and the manufacturer asked to remove all logos of the certifier from product literature, promotional materials, packaging, etc.

Confidentiality 
Confidentiality is of importance to product manufacturers regarding their proprietary process standards. In Germany's system, formulas and process standards are shared with the governmental accreditor: DIBt . DIBt uses the laboratories to audit the factories, but the audits are restricted to quality control tests of the finished products - not their chemical compositions or exact process standards. In North America, manufacturers are obliged to share their process standards with the laboratories, as there is no national accreditor that issues "approvals". This has resulted in the use of "fingerprinting" procedures, where manufacturers will permit their laboratory inspectors to conduct infrared spectroanalysis and other QC tests, in place of the process standards.

Structural fire protection
Fire protection products used in the construction of buildings, ships and offshore facilities are required to conform with the certification listings or approvals. The field installation will comply with code requirements if it is configured within the maximum and minimum tolerances in the listings and approvals. For example, if a drywall assembly has a listing of a 2 hour fire-resistance rating, and all the provisions of the listing were kept in the field, including materials, spacing, workmanship, etc., the 2 hour wall required by the building's designer is likely to withstand a 2 hour fire.

See also
Certification listing
Certification mark
Passive fire protection
Active fire protection
Intumescent
Firestop pillow
Fire door
Fire extinguisher

External links
 UL and IFC video on what happens when field installations don't follow certification listings
 Standards Council of Canada
 USNRC Inspection Report @ Shearon Harris Plant - Rating of installed configurations

Accredited testing and certification organisations 
Canada:
Accreditation: Standards Council of Canada
Certification and Testing:
Underwriters' Laboratories of Canada
Canadian Standards Association (CSA)
Germany:
Accreditation and Approvals: Deutsches Institut für Bautechnik (DIBt)
United States
Testing and Certification: Underwriters Laboratories 
Testing and Certification: Intertek 

Product certification
Fire protection